McEntyre is an unincorporated community in Clarke County, Alabama, United States, also referred to as Bedsole, Mitcham Beat and New Prospect.

It has been described as "Clarke County's Criminal Colony."

References

Unincorporated communities in Clarke County, Alabama
Unincorporated communities in Alabama